The Sora-E is a two-seat electric powered aircraft. It is a joint venture between ACS Aviation of Brazil and Itaipu Binacional of Paraguay.

Development
The Sora-E is a side-by-side two seat low wing tri-cycle gear aircraft of composite construction. A Slovenian electric engine is powered by six lithium-ion polymer (LiPo) batteries.

Specifications (Sora-E)

References

Experimental aircraft
Electric aircraft
2010s Brazilian aircraft
2010s Brazilian experimental aircraft
Aircraft first flown in 2015